Sloboda is a rural locality (a selo) and the administrative center of Slobodskoye Rural Settlement, Bobrovsky District, Voronezh Oblast, Russia. There are 34 streets.

Geography 
Sloboda is located 28 km northeast of Bobrov (the district's administrative centre) by road. Khrenovoye is the nearest rural locality.

References 

Rural localities in Bobrovsky District